Teddy Reno (born 11 July 1926) is an Italian singer, songwriter, actor and record producer.

Life and career 
Born in Trieste as Ferruccio Merk Ricordi, Reno made his debut on Radio Trieste during the Anglo-American administration of the city, launching the song "Eterno ritornello (Te vojo ben)". He later entered as a singer the orchestra of Teddy Foster, with whom he toured across Europe and North Africa. In 1948 he founded one of Italy's first record companies, CGD (i.e. Compagnia Generale del Disco), which he later sold to Ladislao Sugar, a publisher of Hungarian origin and future owner of the Sugar Group. He enjoyed a great degree of success as a singer in the 1950s. In the 1960s he focused his career on discovering and producing new talents, mainly through the Festival degli sconosciuti (Festival of the Unknowns) which he created in 1961. Some or Reno's discoveries at the Festival include The Rokes, Dino and Rita Pavone, whom he married in 1968.

Reno was also active as a film and stage actor and a television and radio presenter.

References

External links 

 Teddy Reno at Discogs

1926 births
Italian male singers
Living people
Musicians from Trieste
Italian pop singers
Italian male film actors
Mass media people from Trieste